Frank L. Dunbar (1860–1945) was an attorney and Republican politician who served as the Oregon's Secretary of State from 1899 to 1907. In 1908, Dunbar was convicted of embezzling funds from the state of Oregon, however he was later acquitted on all charges by the Oregon Supreme Court.

Biography
Dunbar was born on a ship in the Atlantic Ocean. He went to school in Brooklyn, New York, and moved to Astoria, Oregon, in 1882. Dunbar married Lilian Crosby on October 16, 1889, in Seattle, Washington.

Early during his stay in Oregon, Dunbar was worked as a grocery store clerk. He also worked as a bookkeeper. From 1890 to 1894, Dunbar worked as the county recorder and from 1894 to 1898, he worked as the county clerk. He ran for the position of Oregon Secretary of State in 1898 and won. He served from January 9, 1899, to January 14, 1907.

In 1908, Dunbar was convicted of embezzling US$100,000 from the state of Oregon. After an appeal from Dunbar, the Oregon Supreme Court overturned the ruling, clearing Dunbar from all charges.

References

1860 births
1945 deaths
People from Brooklyn
Politicians from Astoria, Oregon
Oregon Republicans
Secretaries of State of Oregon